Karim Dulé Hill (born May 3, 1975) is an American actor. He is known for his roles as personal presidential aide and Deputy Special Assistant to the Chief of Staff Charlie Young on the NBC drama television series The West Wing, for which he received an Emmy nomination for Outstanding Supporting Actor in a Drama Series, and pharmaceutical salesman-private detective Burton "Gus" Guster on the USA Network television comedy-drama Psych. He also had minor roles in the movies Holes, The Guardian, and She's All That and a recurring role on Ballers. He joined the regular cast of Suits for seasons 8 and 9, and plays the father in the 2021 remake of The Wonder Years. Hill also serves as a member of the Screen Actors Guild Board of Directors.

Early life
Hill was born in Orange, New Jersey to Jamaican parents and was raised in Sayreville, New Jersey. He studied ballet at a young age, and appeared in the musical The Tap Dance Kid as Savion Glover's understudy on Broadway, a part he subsequently played on the show's national tour. Hill graduated from Sayreville War Memorial High School in 1993, and studied business finance at Seton Hall University and acting at William Esper Studio. While at Seton Hall, he accepted a role on Jim Henson's CityKids.

Career

In 1985, 10-year-old Hill performed a tap dance number on the MDA telethon. When the music could not be found for his routine, telethon host Jerry Lewis helped by having the orchestra play another song while Hill performed. His first film role was in Sugar Hill in 1993 during his senior year of high school. While in college at Seton Hall, he was cast in a starring role in Bring in 'da Noise, Bring in 'da Funk on Broadway.

In 1999, Hill was cast on The West Wing as Charlie Young, the personal aide to President Josiah Bartlet, who was played by Martin Sheen. During the sixth season of the series, Charlie became a Special Assistant to the Chief of Staff. Hill starred as Charlie for six seasons before he chose to leave the show at the beginning of the seventh season (September 2005) to star in the pilot for the new television show Psych for the USA Network, which premiered July 7, 2006. However, when the announcement was made that The West Wing would be ending in May 2006, Hill returned for the show's last episodes.

Hill also had roles in the 1999 film She's All That starring Freddie Prinze Jr. and Rachael Leigh Cook, both of whom he later reunited with on Psych, as a Los Angeles doctor named Owen in the movie and series 10.5, the Disney movie Holes as Sam the Onion Man (the movie itself was referenced in the Psych episode "65 Million Years Off"), and in The Guardian.

Hill also appeared on Broadway in Stick Fly from December 2011 to February 2012 and After Midnight in November 2013.

As a voice actor, Hill was part of the cast of the 2021 animated feature Night of the Animated Dead, an adaptation of George A. Romero's eponymous book.

Personal life
Hill married actress Nicole Lyn in 2004. They had no children. Hill filed for legal separation from Lyn in 2012 citing irreconcilable differences.

On April 14, 2017, Hill became engaged to girlfriend and Ballers co-star Jazmyn Simon. In early 2018, Hill married Simon and later adopted her daughter. In 2019, Hill and his wife announced the birth of their son.

Filmography

Film

Television

Theatre

Awards and nominations

References

External links

 
 Dule Hill: The Enduring Rage of Dutchman
 Influence of Gregory Hines (NY Daily News)

1975 births
Living people
20th-century American male actors
20th-century American musicians
21st-century American male actors
21st-century American musicians
American actors of Jamaican descent
American male child actors
American male dancers
American male film actors
American male musical theatre actors
American male stage actors
American male television actors
American musicians of Jamaican descent
American tap dancers
Male actors from New Jersey
Musicians from New Jersey
People from Orange, New Jersey
People from Sayreville, New Jersey
Sayreville War Memorial High School alumni
Seton Hall University alumni